The 2018 Ghanaian FA Cup (also called the MTN FA Cup for sponsorship reasons) is the 40th edition of the Ghanaian FA Cup, the knockout football competition of Ghana. The competition was however called off as a result of the dissolution of the GFA in June 2018.

Round of 64
Sankara Nationals 0 - 8 Wa Suntaa

Mighty Jets 0 - 1 Tema Youth

Soccer Intellectuals 0 - 4 Elmina Sharks

River Plate 0 - 1 Asokwa Deportivo

New Edubiase 1 - 0 Thunderbolt

Emmanuel 0 - 1 Nania

Vision 0 - 1 Liberty Professionals

Bebeto 0 - 0 (4 - 3 P) Heart of Lions

Bolga Soccer Masters 3 - 0 Zuarungu

Bis Paradise 1 - 1 (5 - 4 P) Nzema Kotoko

Dreams 4 - 1 Mepom Vatens

Tamale City v Real Tamale

DC United 0 - 0 (5 - 4 P) Brong Ahafo Stars

Winneba United 2 - 0 Venomous Vipers

Likpe Heroes 0 - 0 (3 - 5 P) WAFA

Akatsi All Stars 1 - 0 Agbozume Weavers

Ebusua Dwarfs 0 - 1 Star Madrid

Unistar Academy 2 - 0 Suamponman

Samatex 0 - 0 (2 - 4 P) Karela

Oil City 1 - 2 Medeama

Bibiani Gold Stars 5 - 2 Enchi All Stars

Ashanti Gold 1 - 0 Bechem United

Asante Kotoko 0 - 0 (6 - 5 P) Bepong Storm

Accra Young Wise 0 - 1 Hearts of Oak

Inter Allies 1 - 0 Immigration

Kotoku Royals 3 - 1 Madina Republicans

Jeffis 0 - 2 Wa All Stars

Kintampo Top Talent 4 - 1 Unity

Berekum Chelsea 0 - 1 Berekum Arsenal

Kenyasi New Dreams 2 - 1 Bamboi City

Aduana Stars 1 - 0 Young Apostles

Eleven Wonders 3 - 1 Techiman City

Round of 32
The draw for the round of 32 was held on 5 June 2018.

Nania v Inter Allies

Kintampo Top Talent v Kenyasi New Dreams

Bis Paradise v Star Madrid

Akatsi All Stars v Tema Youth

Asokwa Deportivo v Asante Kotoko

Ashanti Gold v New Edubiase

Bebeto v Hearts of Oak

Dreams v Liberty Professionals

Eleven Wonders v Wa Suntaa

Berekum Arsenal v Bolga Soccer Masters

Karela v Unistar Academy

Wa All Stars v DC United

Medeama v Winneba United

WAFA v Kotoku Royals

Elmina Sharks v Bibiani Gold Stars

Aduana Stars v Tamale City / Real Tamale

Note: All remaining matches called off as a result of a directive from the government of Ghana.

See also
2018 Ghanaian Premier League

References

External links

Ghana
Cup
Cup
Football competitions in Ghana
Ghanaian FA Cup